National Tire Wholesale is a wholesale tire distributor created from a joint venture. The company is headquartered in Palm Beach Gardens, Florida.

History 
January 3, 2018, Michelin North America and Sumitomo Corporation of America announced a definitive agreement to combine their respective North American replacement tire distribution and related service operations in a 50-50 joint venture. On April 5, 2018, the joint venture officially closed, bringing together Michelin North America's Tire Centers and Sumitomo Corporation of Americas' (TBC Corporation) Carroll Tire, owned by TBC Corporation. The combined wholesale unit operates under NTW.

Company operations 
NTW is a wholly owned subsidiary of TBC Corporation through a multi-channel strategy owned by Michelin North America and Sumitomo Corporation of America.

References

External links 
 Official website

Companies based in Palm Beach County, Florida
TBC Corporation
2018 establishments in Florida
Business services companies established in 2018
American companies established in 2018